Annacatia Casagrande (born April 1, 1964) is an Italian sprint canoer who competed in the early 1990s. She was eliminated in the semifinals of K-4 500 m event at the 1992 Summer Olympics in Barcelona.

References
Sports-Reference.com profile

1964 births
Canoeists at the 1992 Summer Olympics
Italian female canoeists
Living people
Olympic canoeists of Italy
Canoeists of Fiamme Oro
Place of birth missing (living people)